The 1999–2000 Coca-Cola Cup was a triangular ODI cricket competition held in Sharjah, United Arab Emirates from 22 to 31 March 2000. It featured the national cricket teams of South Africa, Pakistan and India. Its official sponsor was Coca-Cola. The tournament was won by Pakistan, who defeated South Africa in the final.

Points table

Group stage

1st ODI

2nd ODI

3rd ODI

4th ODI

5th ODI

6th ODI

Final

References

2000 in South African cricket
Cricket in the United Arab Emirates
2000 in Pakistani cricket
2000 in Indian cricket
One Day International cricket competitions
International cricket competitions from 1997–98 to 2000
2000 in Emirati cricket
Coca-Cola